This is a list of presidents of Togo since the formation of the post of president in 1960, to the present day.

A total of four people have served as president (not counting one acting president and two interim military officeholders). Additionally, one person, Faure Gnassingbé, has served on two non-consecutive occasions.

Gnassingbé is the incumbent president, since 4 May 2005.

Description of the office

Election
The president of the Republic is elected by universal, direct and secret suffrage for a mandate of five (05) years.

He is re-eligible.

The election of the president of the Republic takes place by uninominal majority ballot in one (01) round.

The president of the Republic is elected with the majority of the suffrage expressed.

The vote is opened on convocation of the electoral body by decree taken in the Council of Ministers sixty (60) days at least and seventy-five (75) days at most before the expiration of the mandate of the president in office.

No one may be a candidate for the office of the president of the Republic if they:

 are not exclusively of Togolese nationality by birth;
 are not thirty-five (35) years of age on the date of the deposit of the candidature;
 do not enjoy all their civil and political rights;
 do not present a general state of physical and mental well-being duly declared by three (03) sworn physicians, designated by the Constitutional Court;
 do not reside in the national territory for at least twelve (12) months.

The president of the Republic enters office within the fifteen days which follow the proclamation of the results of the presidential election.

Oath of office
Before his entry into office, the president of the Republic swears before the Constitutional Court meeting in solemn hearing, in these terms:

Vacancy
In case of a vacancy of the presidency of the Republic by death, resignation or definitive incapacity, the presidential function is exercised provisionally by the president of the National Assembly.

The vacancy is declared by the Constitutional Court referred to [the matter] by the Government.

The Government convokes the electoral body within the sixty (60) days of the opening of the vacancy for the election of a new president of the Republic.

Residences
After independence, the President of Togo used the Palace of the Governors as an office and residence. The Palace was formerly used by both German and French colonial administrators. In 1970, President Gnassingbé Eyadéma moved in a new Presidential Palace built near the Palace of the Governors. Another residence used by the Gnassingbé Eyadéma was the Presidential Residence of Lomé II. In 2006, a new Presidential Palace, financed by China, was inaugurated by President Faure Gnassingbé on the outskirts of Lomé.

List of officeholders
Key
Political parties

Other factions

Status

Timeline

Latest election

Notes

See also
List of prime ministers of Togo
List of colonial governors of Togo
Politics of Togo

References

External links
World Statesmen – Togo
1992 Constitution of Togo (as amended in 2007)

Togo
Presidents